Palayan, officially the City of Palayan (Ilocano: Siudad ti Palayan), is a 5th class component city and capital of the province of Nueva Ecija, Philippines. According to the 2020 census, it has a population of 45,383 people, making it the most sparsely populated city in the Philippines.

Palayan was created on June 19, 1965, by the Congress of the Philippines and is one of seven planned cities in the Philippines (the other six being Manila, Baguio, Quezon City, Trece Martires, Koronadal and the Island Garden City of Samal).

The new provincial capitol, convention center, and sports center of Nueva Ecija are located in the city.

History

On March 25, 1952, a special consultation meeting was conducted by Governor Leopoldo Diaz along with Congressman Jesus Ilagan, Board Members Dioscoro de Leon and Antonio Corpuz, Don Felipe Buencamino, and the municipal mayors of Nueva Ecija to discuss the transfer the provincial capital from Cabanatuan. As a result, the group unanimously agreed to establish the new capital on the site of the Government Stock Farm located within the municipalities of Laur and Bongabon.  The municipalities of Gapan, San Jose, Santa Rosa, Guimba, Talavera, General Tinio, Baloc (Santo Domingo), and Muñoz were also considered as potential sites for the new capital.

In 1955, President Ramon Magsaysay declared a portion of the Government Stock Farm open for settlement pursuant to presidential Proclamation No. 237.

On June 19, 1965, the Congress of the Philippines enacted Republic Act No. 4475 creating Palayan City as the new capital of Nueva Ecija. "Palayan" (rice paddy) was chosen as the name of the new provincial capital to reflect the moniker bestowed upon the province of Nueva Ecija as the “Rice Granary of the Philippines”. The city government was constituted on December 5, 1965, with then Governor Eduardo L. Joson acting as the city's Ex-Officio Mayor while the Provincial Board constituted the first City Council. Under this administration, Iglesia ni Cristo (INC) purchased a large tract of land at the city's parameters near Laur to house INC members from Hacienda Luisita  due to conflicts arising from union disbandments.

In 1969, Mayor Elpidio O. Cucio and Vice-Mayor Felipe Bautista, both formerly appointed to their respective offices,  were amongst the first elected local officials of the city along with councilors Flor Agustin, Tranquilino dela Cruz, Antonio Pascual, Federico Dacanay, Luis Lacalle and Thomas Lumawig. The city also hosted the National Boy Scout Jamboree attended by thousands of local and foreign scouts during this year.

In August 1969, the city was enlarged by virtue of Republic Act 6052 authored by then Congressman Angel Concepcion which provided for the inclusion of the Military Reservation in Laur and the Fort Magsaysay Cantonment area located in Santa Rosa.

In 1972, by virtue of Proclamation No. 893, a portion of the Government Stock Farm was allocated for the displaced population of Pantabangan due to the construction of the Pantabangan Dam. The resettlement site was eventually converted into barangay Marcos Village.

In 1983, the training ground of the Philippine Army was transferred from Fort Bonifacio in Metro Manila to Fort Ramon Magsaysay. This paved the way for the development of the reservation area into a training complex to serve the army's training requirements.

In 1993, the Asianwide Green Scouts Movement was founded during the first RP-Japan Bilatateral Ecology Work Camp held in the city. The event also led to the establishment of the projects Kawayang Buhay and the Asian Ecology Forest which is supported by the Asian Friendship Society.

In 1995, Barangay Popolon, formerly a barangay of Bongabon, was annexed to the city by virtue of Republic Act No. 8030 ratified by a plebiscite held on October 1, 1995. Moreover,  Bagong Buhay, one of the three resettlement areas in the city, was converted to a regular barangay after a plebiscite on November 26, 1995.

The new provincial capitol building of Nueva Ecija was completed in 2002, solidifying the city's status as both the de facto and de jure capital of the province. The old provincial capitol is located on Burgos Avenue, Cabanatuan, and is still utilized by the provincial government.

Geography

Barangays
Palayan City is politically subdivided into 20 barangays.

 Atate
 Aulo
 Bagong Buhay
 Bo. Militar (Fort Magsaysay)
 Caballero (Poblacion)
 Caimito (Poblacion)
 Doña Josefa
 Ganaderia (Poblacion)
 Imelda Valley I
 Imelda Valley II
 Langka
 Malate (Poblacion)
 Maligaya
 Manacnac
 Mapaet
 Marcos Village
 Popolon (Pagas)
 Santolan (Poblacion)
 Sapang Buho
 Singalat

Climate

Demographics

Economy

Sister cities
  Tagaytay, Cavite
  Virac, Catanduanes
  Tayabas, Quezon

Gallery

References

External links

 
 [ Philippine Standard Geographic Code]
 Philippine Census Information
 Local Governance Performance Management System

Cities in Nueva Ecija
Provincial capitals of the Philippines
Populated places established in 1965
1965 establishments in the Philippines
Populated places on the Pampanga River
Planned cities in the Philippines
Component cities in the Philippines